The large-scaled burrowing skink (Feylinia grandisquamis) is an African lizard in the family Scincidae commonly known as skinks. It is found in Cameroon, Gabon, Angola, and Central African Republic.

References

External links

Feylinia
Skinks of Africa
Taxa named by Lorenz Müller
Reptiles described in 1910